Catherine Osson (born 7 February 1974) is a French politician of La République En Marche! (LREM) who served as a member of the French National Assembly from 2017 to 2022, representing the department of Nord.

Political career
In parliament, Osson serves as member of the Committee on Finance and Budgetary Control. In addition to her committee assignments, she is a member of the French-Belgian Parliamentary Friendship Group. Since 2019, she has also been a member of the French delegation to the Franco-German Parliamentary Assembly.

In 2020, Osson joined En commun (EC), a group within LREM led by Barbara Pompili.

She lost her seat in the second round of the 2022 French legislative election to David Guiraud from La France Insoumise.

Political positions
In July 2019, Osson voted in favour of the French ratification of the European Union’s Comprehensive Economic and Trade Agreement (CETA) with Canada.

See also
 2017 French legislative election

References

1974 births
Living people
People from Croix, Nord
Deputies of the 15th National Assembly of the French Fifth Republic
La République En Marche! politicians
21st-century French women politicians
Place of birth missing (living people)
Women members of the National Assembly (France)

Members of Parliament for Nord